Ludwig Gotthard Kosegarten (1 February 1758 – 26 October 1818), also known as Ludwig Theobul or Ludwig Theoboul, was a German poet and Lutheran preacher.

Kosegarten was born in Grevesmühlen, in the Duchy of Mecklenburg-Schwerin. After studying theology at the University of Greifswald, he served as the pastor of Altenkirchen on the island of Rügen, then part of Swedish Pomerania.

After his ordination in 1792 he was given the rectorate in the parish church of Altenkirchen on Rügen. In this capacity he gave the famous shore sermons on the cliffs near Vitt. He went there to the herring fishermen, who during the time of herring fishing could not go to the church in Altenkirchen due to their work. These sermons were a great success, which is why the Vitt Chapel was erected in 1806. During his stay on Rügen he wrote many reports about the island, that made both Rügen and Kosegarten famous.

Kosegarten's books were burned at the Wartburg festival on 18 October 1817.  He influenced the work of Philipp Otto Runge, Caspar David Friedrich, and the music of Franz Schubert.

References
Lewis Holmes. Kosegarten: The Turbulent Life & Times of a Northern German Poet. Peter Lang, Jan 1, 2004

1758 births
1818 deaths
People from Grevesmühlen
People from the Duchy of Mecklenburg-Schwerin
18th-century German Lutheran clergy
German poets
Writers from Mecklenburg-Western Pomerania
University of Greifswald alumni
German male poets
19th-century German Lutheran clergy